MSMM may refer to:

 Mahou Shoujo Madoka Magica
 Mike Shayne Mystery Magazine